A marque or brand is a set of marketing and communication methods that help to distinguish a company from competitors.

Marque may also refer to:

People
 Marque (musician), Austrian pop singer
 Albert Marque (1872–1939), French sculptor and doll maker
 Alejandro Marque (born 1981), Spanish cyclist

Other uses
 Marque (river), a tributary of the Deûle in France
 Letter of marque, government license authorising a privateer to attack enemy vessels

See also
 Marquesas Islands, a group of volcanic islands in French Polynesia
 Marques (disambiguation)
 Marquee (disambiguation)
 Marquis (disambiguation)
 Mark (disambiguation)